This is a list of African-American newspapers that have been published in Mississippi.  It includes both current and historical newspapers.

The first such newspaper in Mississippi was the Colored Citizen in 1867. More than 70 African-American newspapers were founded across Mississippi between 1867 and 1899, in at least 37 different towns.  From 1900 to 1980, at least 116 more such newspapers were founded in the state, but increasingly concentrated in the larger cities. The Jackson Advocate is the oldest African American newspaper still in publication.  The Mississippi Link was one of the first African American publications to be widely available on the internet.

Several African-American newspapers are currently published in Mississippi. They are highlighted in green in the list below.

Newspapers

See also 
List of African-American newspapers and media outlets
List of African-American newspapers in Alabama
List of African-American newspapers in Arkansas
List of African-American newspapers in Louisiana
List of African-American newspapers in Tennessee
List of newspapers in Mississippi

Works cited

References 

Newspapers
Mississippi
African-American
African-American newspapers